A famous sire of Quarter Horses, Three Bars (1940–1968) was a registered Thoroughbred racehorse before going on to become a member of the American Quarter Horse Association's (or AQHA) American Quarter Horse Hall of Fame in 1989.

Life
Foaled April 8, 1940, Three Bars was sired by Percentage and out of Myrtle Dee. After a promising showing in race training, he developed leg problems and never raced well before he was six years old. By that time, he was in Arizona, owned by Sidney H. Vail, who paid $10,000 for him in 1945. Eventually, his leg problems cleared up enough for him to race and show great early speed. He won the Speed Handicap in 1946 at Hipodromo de Tijuana, Tijuana, Mexico; which was a three-fourths of a mile, $4,000 ungraded stakes race for horses three years old or older. The winning time was 1:10 and a fifth. Vail leased him to Walter Merrick, an early breeder of racing Quarter Horses, for a few years, but also stood him in Arizona and California. Three Bars died in March, 1968 in Oklahoma on Walter Merrick's ranch.

Sire Record

Three Bars was the sire of 29 AQHA Champions, 4 AQHA Supreme Champions, 317 Racing Register of Merit earners, and his foals earned more than $3 million on the racetrack. Among his famous offspring were Mr. Bar None, Gay Bar King, Sugar Bars, Lightning Bar, Tonto Bars Gill, St. Bar, Steel Bars, and Bar Money. Others include Triple Chick, Alamitos Bar, Bar Depth, Royal Bar, Josie's Bar, and Galobar. His grandson Doc Bar became one of the most influential sires of cutting horses ever known. Another grandson, Tonto Bars Hank, sired all around horses. Jewel's Leo Bars (Freckles), an outstanding cutting horse and sire of cutting horses, was another grandson of Three Bars (TB). Impressive, a triple descendant of Three Bars, became the most prepotent sire of Quarter Horse halter horses from the 1970s through the 1990s. His offspring Rocket Bar (TB), Sugar Bars, Lena's Bar (TB), Lightning Bar and Zippo Pat Bars were all inducted into the American Quarter Horse Hall of Fame. Of his grandget, Doc Bar, Zippo Pine Bar, Easy Jet, Kaweah Bar, Zan Parr Bar, and The Invester were inducted into the AQHA Hall of Fame. Four of his sons were AQHA Supreme Champions — Kid Meyers, Bar Money, Fairbars, and Goldseeker Bars.

Pedigree

Notes

References

 The American Racing Manual 1947 Edition Lexington, Kentucky: Triangle Publications 1947
 All Breed Pedigree Database Pedigree of Three Bars retrieved on July 5, 2007
 
 Mattson, Paul The Real American Quarter Horse: Versatile Athletes who proved Supreme Wamego, Kansas:Premier Publishing 1991 
 Nye, Nelson C. The Complete Book of the Quarter Horse: A Breeder's Guide and Turfman's Reference New York:A. S. Barnes 1964
 Pitzer, Andrea Laycock The Most Influential Quarter Horse Sires Tacoma, WA:Premier Pedigrees 1987
 Simmons, Diance C. Legends: Outstanding Quarter Horse Stallions and Mares Colorado Springs:Western Horseman 1993

Further reading

 Groves, Lesli Krause "Three Bars" Quarter Horse Journal May 1996
 McKnight, James "A Year to Remember" Quarter Racing Journal May 1995
 Thornton, Larry "The Working Lines: Three Bars" Southern Horseman November 1990

External links
 Three Bars at Foundation Horses
 Three Bars at Quarter Horse Directory
 Three Bars at Quarter Horse Legends

1940 racehorse births
1968 racehorse deaths
Thoroughbred family 4-m
American Quarter Horse sires
Racehorses bred in Kentucky
Racehorses trained in the United States
AQHA Hall of Fame (horses)